Athanasius IV served as Greek Patriarch of Alexandria between 1417 and 1425.

References

15th-century Patriarchs of Alexandria